Tesfai Ghebreselassie was Eritrea's Minister of Energy & Mines since Independence in 1993 until 2011. He has overseen agreements with Anadarko Petroleum and various gold mining and mineral companies. Furthermore, he has overseen the maturation of the Eritrean Electric Authority. His portfolio was changed to that of the Ministry of Land, Water & Environment in 2011.

References

Living people
People's Front for Democracy and Justice politicians
Government ministers of Eritrea
Year of birth missing (living people)